Franklin J. Sawtelle (1846–1911) was an American architect practicing in Providence, Rhode Island.  He was known primarily as a designer of private residences.

Life and career
Sawtelle was born in 1846 in the town of Norridgewock, Maine.  He was educated in the local schools, and as a teenager began his architectural studies in the Portland office of Francis H. Fassett. In 1873 he relocated to Providence, taking a job with Stone & Carpenter. After seven years, in 1880, he opened his own office. He practiced alone for his entire career, except for 1901 and 1902, when his firm was Sawtelle, Robertson & Shurrocks.  The other two partners were Wayland T. Robertson and Alfred F. Shurrocks.  Sawtelle died in 1911, while engaged on the commission for the Wheeler School.  The structure as built was designed by Sawtelle's assistant, Frances E. Henley, who established her own office after Sawtelle's death.

Sawtelle was actively involved in the local chapter of the AIA.  He joined in 1885, and between then and his death served in several different official capacities.

Architectural Works

F. J. Sawtelle, 1880-1901
 1882 - James Street School, 75 James St, East Providence, Rhode Island
 Demolished c.2004
 1883 - Mary C. Wheeler House, 26 Cabot St, Providence, Rhode Island
 Demolished
 1884 - Horton Building, 19 Park St, Attleboro, Massachusetts
 Demolished
 1885 - Bates Block, 7 N Main St, Attleboro, Massachusetts
 1886 - Mary J. A. Grinnell House, 2 Brenton Ave, Providence, Rhode Island
 1888 - Blackstone Park Chapel, 209 Wayland Ave, Providence, Rhode Island
 Demolished
 1889 - Hope Webbing Company Mill, 999-1005 Main St, Pawtucket, Rhode Island
 1889 - Horatio A. Hunt House, 165 Waterman St, Providence, Rhode Island
 1891 - Gregory Building, 1 Main St, Wickford, Rhode Island
 1893 - Sophia F. Brown House, 192 Bowen St, Providence, Rhode Island
 1893 - Central Congregational Church Rectory, 20 Diman Pl, Providence, Rhode Island
 1893 - Stephen W. Sessions House, 274 Olney St, Providence, Rhode Island
 1894 - Miro O. Weeden House, 81 Brown St, Providence, Rhode Island
 Demolished
 1895 - Edwin P. Anthony House, 180 Angell St, Providence, Rhode Island
 1895 - Theodore H. Bliss House, 46 Cooke St, Providence, Rhode Island
 1896 - Charles A. Calder House, 50 Humboldt Ave, Providence, Rhode Island
 1898 - North Kingstown Free Library (Town Hall Annex), 55 Brown St, Wickford, Rhode Island

Sawtelle, Robertson & Shurrocks, 1901-1902
 1902 - U. S. Post Office, 652-656 Broadway, Olneyville, Rhode Island
 Demolished
 1902 - Mary L. McCarthy Duplex, 71-73 Barnes St, Providence, Rhode Island
 1902 - Charles M. Mumford House, 315 Olney St, Providence, Rhode Island
 1902 - Robert B. Parker House, 67 Manning St, Providence, Rhode Island
 1902 - Simeon B. Tilley House, 353 Olney St, Providence, Rhode Island
 Demolished

F. J. Sawtelle, 1902-1911
 1904 - Taftville Congregational Church, 16 N B St, Taftville, Connecticut
 1905 - Smith-Malmstead House, 77 Princeton Ave, Providence, Rhode Island 
1906 - Sarah L. Herreshoff House, 11 Burton St, Bristol, Rhode Island
 1909 - C. Abbott Phillips House, 150 Slater Ave, Providence, Rhode Island

References

1846 births
1911 deaths
19th-century American architects
Architects from Providence, Rhode Island
People from Norridgewock, Maine